Gloxinella is a monotypic genus of flowering plants belonging to the family Gesneriaceae. It only contains one species, Gloxinella lindeniana (Regel) Roalson & Boggan 

It is native to Colombia.

The genus name is in honour of Benjamin Peter Gloxin (1765–1794), a German physician and botanical writer. The specific Latin epithet of lindeniana refers to the Luxemburg born botanist Jean Jules Linden (1817-1898).

It was first described and published in Selbyana Vol.25 on page 227 in 2005.

References

Gesnerioideae
Gesneriaceae genera
Plants described in 2005
Flora of Colombia